Erik Nascimento Lima (born 18 July 1994), simply known as Erik, is a Brazilian professional footballer who plays as a forward. He currently play for J2 League club, Machida Zelvia.

He began his career at Goiás in 2013, scoring 36 goals in 103 matches across all competitions and winning the Best Newcomer Award in the 2014 Campeonato Brasileiro Série A. In 2015, he transferred to Palmeiras for €3 million.

Club career

Goiás
Born in Novo Repartimento, Pará, Erik joined Goiás's youth setup in 2004, aged 10, after impressing on a trial when visiting family in Goiânia. In February 2013, after impressing with the under-20s in Copa São Paulo de Futebol Júnior, he was promoted to the main squad.

On 7 March 2013 Erik renewed his link with the Esmeraldino, signing until December 2016. He made his senior debut on the 27th, coming on as a second-half substitute for David in a 2–0 home win against CRAC for the Campeonato Goiano championship; he appeared in only one further match in the competition, as his side finished second.

On 7 July 2013 Erik made his Série A debut, starting in a 1–0 home win against Vitória. He only appeared rarely during the campaign, with his side finishing in an unexpected sixth position.

Erik scored his first goal as a senior on 26 February 2014, netting the first in a 2–1 home win against Anápolis. He subsequently overtook veteran Araújo and Rychely during the year.

Erik started the first league game of the campaign, a 1–0 away win against Atlético Mineiro on 4 May. He scored his first goal in the competition on the 23rd, netting the last in a 2–2 home draw against Santos, and subsequently was an ever-present figure for the club, scoring a hat-trick against Atlético Paranaense on 31 August, and also adding braces against Bahia and Chapecoense. After finishing the campaign with 12 goals, he was named Best Newcomer.

After being strongly linked to a move, Erik remained with Goiás for 2015. In the year's Goiano he scored two braces, against Atlético Goianiense and Grêmio Anápolis, as his team won the state title. In the year's national tournament, Erik recorded 10 goals from 26 games, including two-goal hauls in 3–0 wins over São Paulo, Vasco da Gama and Joinville in the middle of the campaign; the latter two teams were relegated alongside Goiás.

Palmeiras
Amid interest from Turkey's Fenerbahçe, Erik signed a five-year contract for Palmeiras on 23 December 2015; the Verdão purchased 60% of his economic rights for a fee of €3 million.

He made his debut on 19 January in the first match of the new Campeonato Paulista season, replacing Gabriel Jesus for the final 16 minutes of a 2–0 win at Botafogo (SP). Regularly a substitute, he did not score in his first campaign. His national league debut came on 29 May, again in place of Gabriel Jesus in a 1–0 loss at city rivals São Paulo. In his next game, a start on 4 July, he scored his first Palmeiras goal in his 14th game, opening a 3–1 win at Sport Recife.

On 14 December 2017, Atlético Mineiro announced the acquisition of Erik on a year-long loan deal for the 2018 season. However, after a string of poor performances, he was demoted to the reserve team. Subsequently, he left the side and joined Botafogo on loan on 17 August for the remainder of the season.

On 26 July 2019 Erik moved abroad for the first time when he joined Yokohama F. Marinos of Japan's J1 League  on an 18-month loan.

Changchun Yatai
Erik went to China and joined to Chinese Super League club, Changchun Yatai from mid 2021 season.

FC Machida Zelvia
On 1 January 2023, Erik return to Japan for the first time in three years and signed transfer to J2 club, Machida Zelvia for upcoming 2023 season.

International career
On 8 May 2013 Erik was called up to Brazil under-20 team, for the year's Toulon Tournament. A backup to Giovanni and Vinícius Araújo, he only appeared against Nigeria on 4 June, scoring the first in a 1–1 draw; his side was eventually crowned champions shortly after.

On 6 March 2015 Erik was called up to the under-23s, making his debut in a 4–1 home routing over Paraguay on 27 March.

Career statistics

Club
.

Honours

Club
Palmeiras
 Campeonato Brasileiro Série A: 2016
Yokohama F. Marinos
 J1 League: 2019

International
 Toulon Tournament: 2013

Individual
 Campeonato Brasileiro Série A Best Newcomer: 2014

References

External links 
 
 

1994 births
Living people
Sportspeople from Pará
Brazilian footballers
Association football forwards
Campeonato Brasileiro Série A players
Goiás Esporte Clube players
Sociedade Esportiva Palmeiras players
Clube Atlético Mineiro players
Botafogo de Futebol e Regatas players
Yokohama F. Marinos players
Changchun Yatai F.C. players
FC Machida Zelvia players
China League One players
J1 League players
J2 League players
Brazilian expatriate footballers
Brazilian expatriate sportspeople in Japan
Brazilian expatriate sportspeople in China
Expatriate footballers in Japan
Brazil under-20 international footballers
Brazil youth international footballers
Footballers at the 2015 Pan American Games
Pan American Games bronze medalists for Brazil
Pan American Games medalists in football
Medalists at the 2015 Pan American Games